
Brzeg County is a unit of territorial administration and local government (powiat) in Opole Voivodeship, south-western Poland. It came into being on January 1, 1999, as a result of the Polish local government reforms passed in 1998.

As of 2019 its total population is 90,054, out of which the population of Brzeg is 35,890, that of Grodków is 8,595, that of Lewin Brzeski is 5,736, and the rural population is 39,833.

Neighbouring counties
Brzeg County is bordered by Namysłów County to the north-east, Opole County to the south-east, Nysa County to the south, and Strzelin County and Oława County to the west.

Administrative division
The county is subdivided into six gminas (one urban, two urban-rural and three rural). These are listed in the following table, in descending order of population.

References

 
Brzeg